Rafał Przybylski (born 19 February 1991) is a Polish handball player for KS Azoty-Puławy and for the Polish national handball team.

He competed at the 2017 World Men's Handball Championship in France.

References

External links

1991 births
Living people
Sportspeople from Szczecin
Polish male handball players
Expatriate handball players
Polish expatriate sportspeople in France